Françoise d'Humières, Dame de Contay, née de Contay (circa 1489-1557), was a French court official; she served as Governess of the Children of France from 1546 to 1557.

Françoise d'Humières was the daughter of Charles de Contay, sénéchal du Maine, and Barbe de Hallwin, and married the courtier Jean d'Humières (d. 1550) in 1507. She inherited the lordship of Contay from her father, and became Dame de Contay.

In 1546, she and her spouse were appointed governor and governess to the Dauphin, and subsequently became the main governor and governess to all the children of king Henry II of France and Catherine de Medici.  The royal children were raised under their direct supervision, under the orders of Diane de Poitiers.  As head governor and governess, the d'Humières couple headed the staff of the royal nursery,  staff of about 250 people, which included tutors and governesses of lower rank, who attended more directly to each of the children. Among them was notably Marie-Catherine Gondi, who served as sub-governess.  The royal children were mainly raised away from the rest of the court at the Château de Saint-Germain-en-Laye, and when the royal court visited Saint Germain, the nursery was sent to Château de Blois or Château d'Amboise. From 1548, the nursery was expanded to include Mary, Queen of Scots and her governess (Janet Stewart, Lady Fleming, later Françoise de Paroy) and  personal Scottish entourage of about 30 people.

When her spouse died in 1550, he was succeeded as governor by Claude d'Urfé, who was given charge of the finances of the royal nursery, but the king confirmed Françoise d'Humières as main governess with the responsibility for his children.

Several letters are known between the king and queen and the d'Humières regarding the upbringing of the royal children.

References

Sources

Robert J. Knecht,    Hero or Tyrant? Henry III, King of France, 1574-89
The girlhood of Mary queen of Scots from her landing in France in August 1548 to her departure from France in August 1561
 Keith Busby, Terry Nixon, Alison, Les Manuscrits de Chrétien de Troyes

1489 births
1557 deaths
Governesses to the Children of France
Catherine de' Medici
Henry III of France
Charles IX of France
Court of Henry II of France